Battle of Ruxukou or Battle of Ruxu may refer to:

 Battle of Ruxu (213), fought in 213 between the warlords Cao Cao and Sun Quan
 Battle of Ruxu (217), fought in 217 between the warlords Cao Cao and Sun Quan
 Battle of Ruxu (222–223), fought in 222–223 between the states of Cao Wei and Eastern Wu